The 78th Golden Globe Awards honored the best in American television of 2020, as well as film in 2020 and early 2021, as chosen by the Hollywood Foreign Press Association (HFPA). The ceremony took place on February 28, 2021, nearly two months later than normal, due to the impact of the COVID-19 pandemic on cinema and on television. Produced by Dick Clark Productions and the HFPA, and aired live on NBC in the United States, this was the first bi-coastal ceremony, with Tina Fey co-hosting from The Rainbow Room in New York City, and Amy Poehler co-hosting from The Beverly Hilton in Beverly Hills, California.

The nominees were announced on February 3, 2021. Jane Fonda and Norman Lear were announced as the recipients of the Cecil B. DeMille Award and the Carol Burnett Award, respectively.

With four wins, The Crown won the most awards at the ceremony, including Best Television Series – Drama. Schitt's Creek and The Queen's Gambit won two awards each, with Schitt's Creek winning Best Television Series – Musical or Comedy and The Queen's Gambit winning Best Miniseries or Television Film. In film, Borat Subsequent Moviefilm, Nomadland, and Soul won two awards each, with Nomadland winning Best Motion Picture – Drama and Borat Subsequent Moviefilm winning Best Motion Picture – Musical or Comedy.

Production
Tina Fey and Amy Poehler were announced as the hosts of the ceremony, for the fourth time, in January 2020. By June 2020, the HFPA decided to postpone the ceremony from its normal date in early January to February 28 due to both the impact of the COVID-19 pandemic on cinema and on television production. On February 2, 2021, it was reported that the ceremony would be held from both the Rainbow Room in New York City and the Golden Globes' usual home at The Beverly Hilton in Beverly Hills, California, allowing those on the East Coast to participate without having to make the cross-country trip.

The nominees were announced on February 3, 2021.

Timetable
 The eligibility period for motion pictures was extended to February 28, 2021.

Winners and nominees

Film

{| class=wikitable style="width=100%"
|-
! colspan=2 | Best Motion Picture
|-
!style="width=50%" | Drama
!style="width=50%" | Musical or Comedy
|-
| valign="top" |
 Nomadland
 The Father
 Mank
 Promising Young Woman
 The Trial of the Chicago 7
| valign="top" |
 Borat Subsequent Moviefilm
 Hamilton
 Music
 Palm Springs
 The Prom
|-
! colspan=2 | Best Performance in a Motion Picture – Drama
|-
! Actor
! Actress
|-
| valign="top" |
 Chadwick Boseman  – Ma Rainey's Black Bottom as Levee Green
 Riz Ahmed – Sound of Metal as Ruben Stone
 Anthony Hopkins – The Father as Anthony
 Gary Oldman – Mank as Herman J. Mankiewicz
 Tahar Rahim – The Mauritanian as Mohamedou Ould Salahi
| valign="top" |
 Andra Day – The United States vs. Billie Holiday as Billie Holiday
 Viola Davis – Ma Rainey's Black Bottom as Ma Rainey
 Vanessa Kirby – Pieces of a Woman as Martha Weiss
 Frances McDormand – Nomadland as Fern
 Carey Mulligan – Promising Young Woman as Cassandra "Cassie" Thomas
|-
! colspan=2 | Best Performance in a Motion Picture – Musical or Comedy
|-
! Actor
! Actress
|-
| valign="top" |
 Sacha Baron Cohen – Borat Subsequent Moviefilm as Borat Sagdiyev
 James Corden – The Prom as Barry Glickman
 Lin-Manuel Miranda – Hamilton as Alexander Hamilton
 Dev Patel – The Personal History of David Copperfield as David Copperfield
 Andy Samberg – Palm Springs as Nyles
| valign="top" |
 Rosamund Pike – I Care a Lot as Marla Grayson
 Maria Bakalova – Borat Subsequent Moviefilm as Tutar Sagdiyev
 Kate Hudson – Music as Kazu "Zu" Gamble
 Michelle Pfeiffer – French Exit as Frances Price
 Anya Taylor-Joy – Emma as Emma Woodhouse
|-
! colspan=2 | Best Supporting Performance in a Motion Picture
|-
! Supporting Actor
! Supporting Actress
|-
| valign="top" |
 Daniel Kaluuya – Judas and the Black Messiah as Fred Hampton
 Sacha Baron Cohen – The Trial of the Chicago 7 as Abbie Hoffman
 Jared Leto – The Little Things as Albert Sparma
 Bill Murray – On the Rocks as Felix Keane
 Leslie Odom Jr. – One Night in Miami... as Sam Cooke
| valign="top" |
 Jodie Foster – The Mauritanian as Nancy Hollander
 Glenn Close – Hillbilly Elegy as Bonnie "Mamaw" Vance
 Olivia Colman – The Father as Anne
 Amanda Seyfried – Mank as Marion Davies
 Helena Zengel – News of the World as Johanna Leonberger
|-
! colspan=2 | Other
|-
! Best Director
! Best Screenplay
|-
| valign="top" |
 Chloé Zhao – Nomadland
 Emerald Fennell – Promising Young Woman
 David Fincher – Mank
 Regina King – One Night in Miami...
 Aaron Sorkin – The Trial of the Chicago 7
| valign="top" |
 Aaron Sorkin – The Trial of the Chicago 7
 Emerald Fennell – Promising Young Woman
 Jack Fincher  – Mank
 Christopher Hampton and Florian Zeller – The Father
 Chloé Zhao – Nomadland
|-
! Best Original Score
! Best Original Song
|-
| valign="top" |
 Jon Batiste, Trent Reznor, and Atticus Ross – Soul
 Alexandre Desplat – The Midnight Sky
 Ludwig Göransson – Tenet
 James Newton Howard – News of the World
 Trent Reznor and Atticus Ross – Mank
| valign="top" |
 "Io sì (Seen)" (Niccolò Agliardi, Laura Pausini, and Diane Warren) – The Life Ahead
 "Fight for You" (D'Mile, H.E.R., and Tiara Thomas) – Judas and the Black Messiah
 "Hear My Voice" (Celeste and Daniel Pemberton) – The Trial of the Chicago 7
 "Speak Now" (Sam Ashworth and Leslie Odom Jr.) – One Night in Miami...
 "Tigress & Tweed" (Andra Day and Raphael Saadiq) – The United States vs. Billie Holiday
|-
! Best Animated Feature Film
! Best Foreign Language Film
|-
| valign="top" |
 Soul
 The Croods: A New Age
 Onward
 Over the Moon
 Wolfwalkers
| valign="top" |
 Minari (United States) Another Round (Denmark)
 La Llorona (Guatemala)
 The Life Ahead (Italy)
 Two of Us (France)
|}

Films with multiple nominations
The following films received multiple nominations:

Films with multiple wins
The following films received multiple wins:

Television
{| class=wikitable style="width=100%"
|-
! colspan=2 | Best Television Series
|-
!style="width=50%" | Drama
!style="width=50%" | Musical or Comedy
|-
| valign="top" |
 The Crown (Netflix) Lovecraft Country (HBO)
 The Mandalorian (Disney+)
 Ozark (Netflix)
 Ratched (Netflix)
| valign="top" |
 Schitt's Creek (Pop TV) Emily in Paris (Netflix)
 The Flight Attendant (HBO Max)
 The Great (Hulu)
 Ted Lasso (Apple TV+)
|-
! colspan=2 | Best Miniseries or Television Film
|-
| colspan=2 style="vertical-align:top;" |
 The Queen's Gambit (Netflix) Normal People (Hulu)
 Small Axe (Prime Video)
 The Undoing (HBO)
 Unorthodox (Netflix)
|-
! colspan=2 | Best Performance in a Television Series – Drama
|-
! Actor
! Actress
|-
| valign="top" |
 Josh O'Connor – The Crown (Netflix) as Charles, Prince of Wales Jason Bateman – Ozark (Netflix) as Martin "Marty" Byrde
 Bob Odenkirk – Better Call Saul (AMC) as Saul Goodman
 Al Pacino – Hunters (Amazon Prime Video) as Meyer Offerman
 Matthew Rhys – Perry Mason (HBO) as Perry Mason
| valign="top" |
 Emma Corrin – The Crown (Netflix) as Diana, Princess of Wales Olivia Colman – The Crown (Netflix) as Queen Elizabeth II
 Jodie Comer – Killing Eve (BBC America) as Villanelle
 Laura Linney – Ozark (Netflix) as Wendy Byrde
 Sarah Paulson – Ratched (Netflix) as Nurse Ratched
|-
! colspan=2 | Best Performance in a Television Series – Musical or Comedy
|-
! Actor
! Actress
|-
| valign="top" |
 Jason Sudeikis – Ted Lasso (Apple TV+) as Ted Lasso Don Cheadle – Black Monday (Showtime) as Maurice Monroe
 Nicholas Hoult – The Great (Hulu) as Peter III of Russia
 Eugene Levy – Schitt's Creek (Pop TV) as Johnny Rose
 Ramy Youssef – Ramy (Hulu) as Ramy Hassan
| valign="top" |
 Catherine O'Hara – Schitt's Creek (Pop TV) as Moira Rose
 Lily Collins – Emily in Paris (Netflix) as Emily Cooper
 Kaley Cuoco – The Flight Attendant (HBO Max) as Cassie Bowden
 Elle Fanning – The Great (Hulu) as Catherine the Great
 Jane Levy – Zoey's Extraordinary Playlist (NBC) as Zoey Clarke
|-
! colspan=2 | Best Performance in a Miniseries or Television Film
|-
! Actor
! Actress
|-
| valign="top" |
 Mark Ruffalo – I Know This Much Is True (HBO) as Dominick and Thomas Birdsey
 Bryan Cranston – Your Honor (Showtime) as Michael Desiato
 Jeff Daniels – The Comey Rule (Showtime) as James Comey
 Hugh Grant – The Undoing (HBO) as Jonathan Fraser
 Ethan Hawke – The Good Lord Bird (Showtime) as John Brown
| valign="top" |
 Anya Taylor-Joy – The Queen's Gambit (Netflix) as Beth Harmon
 Cate Blanchett – Mrs. America (FX on Hulu) as Phyllis Schlafly
 Daisy Edgar-Jones – Normal People (Hulu) as Marianne Sheridan
 Shira Haas – Unorthodox (Netflix) as Esther "Esty" Shapiro
 Nicole Kidman – The Undoing (HBO) as Grace Fraser
|-
! colspan=2 | Best Supporting Performance in a Series, Miniseries or Television Film
|-
! Supporting Actor
! Supporting Actress
|-
| valign="top" |
 John Boyega – Small Axe (Prime Video) as Leroy Logan
 Brendan Gleeson – The Comey Rule (Showtime) as President Donald Trump
 Dan Levy – Schitt's Creek (Pop TV) as David Rose
 Jim Parsons – Hollywood (Netflix) as Henry Willson
 Donald Sutherland – The Undoing (HBO) as Franklin Reinhardt
| valign="top" |
 Gillian Anderson – The Crown (Netflix) as Margaret Thatcher
 Helena Bonham Carter – The Crown (Netflix) as Princess Margaret
 Julia Garner – Ozark (Netflix) as Ruth Langmore
 Annie Murphy – Schitt's Creek (Pop TV) as Alexis Rose
 Cynthia Nixon – Ratched (Netflix) as Gwendolyn Briggs
|}

Series with multiple nominations
The following television series received multiple nominations:

Series with multiple wins
The following series received multiple wins:

Cecil B. DeMille Award
The Cecil B. DeMille Award is an honorary award bestowed to honorees who have made a significant mark in the film industry. It is named after its first recipient, director Cecil B. DeMille.

 Jane Fonda

Carol Burnett Award
The Carol Burnett Award is an honorary award given for outstanding and lasting contributions to television on or off the screen. It is named in honor of its first recipient, actress Carol Burnett.

 Norman Lear

Ceremony

Golden Globe Ambassadors
The Golden Globe Ambassadors are Jackson Lee and Satchel Lee, the son and daughter of Spike Lee and Tonya Lewis Lee.

Presenters
The following individuals presented awards at the ceremony:

 Laura Dern with Best Supporting Actor – Motion Picture
 Angela Bassett with Best Supporting Actor – Series, Miniseries or Television Film
 Colin Farrell introduced The Father Christian Slater (in New York City) with Best Actress – Television Series Musical or Comedy
 Tiffany Haddish with Best Animated Feature Film
 Yahya Abdul-Mateen II introduced The Trial of the Chicago 7 Amanda Seyfried introduced Mank Justin Theroux (in New York City) with Best Actor – Miniseries or Television Film
 Cynthia Erivo with Best Screenplay
 Sarah Paulson introduced The Prom Tina Fey and Amy Poehler with the Carol Burnett Award and the Cecil B. DeMille Award
 Salma Hayek introduced Nomadland Kevin Bacon and Kyra Sedgwick with Best Actress – Television Series Drama
 Tracy Morgan (in New York City) with Best Original Song and Best Original Score
 Kate Hudson introduced Music Sterling K. Brown and Susan Kelechi Watson with Best Actor – Television Series Musical or Comedy and Best Television Series – Musical or Comedy
 Ben Stiller (in New York City) with Best Actress – Motion Picture Musical or Comedy
 Margot Robbie introduced Promising Young Woman Anthony Anderson with Best Actor – Television Series Drama
 Gal Gadot with Best Foreign Language Film
 Kenan Thompson with Best Television Series – Drama
 Ava DuVernay introduced Hamilton Jamie Lee Curtis with Best Supporting Actress – Motion Picture
 Christopher Meloni (in New York City) with Best Supporting Actress – Series, Miniseries or Television Film
 Jeanise Jones introduced Borat Subsequent Moviefilm Rosie Perez (in New York City) with Best Actress – Miniseries or Television Film and Best Miniseries or Television Film
 Renée Zellweger with Best Actor – Motion Picture Drama
 Bryce Dallas Howard (in New York City) with Best Director
 Sandra Oh introduced Palm Springs Annie Mumolo and Kristen Wiig with Best Motion Picture – Musical or Comedy
 Awkwafina with Best Actor – Motion Picture Musical or Comedy
 Joaquin Phoenix with Best Actress – Motion Picture Drama
 Michael Douglas and Catherine Zeta-Jones (in New York City) with Best Motion Picture – Drama

Reception

Critical response
According to the review aggregator website Metacritic, which sampled 15 critic reviews and calculated a weighted average score of 35 out of 100, the ceremony received "generally unfavorable reviews". On Rotten Tomatoes, 10% of 21 critics have given the ceremony a positive review, with an average rating of 3.52/10. The critics consensus on the website reads: "Disappointingly dull and disturbingly lacking in self-awareness, The 78th Golden Globes ceremony wastes its menagerie of celebrities—and some well-deserved wins—on a stilted ceremony overshadowed by HFPA's questionable behind-the-scenes behavior."

Controversies
The ceremony received criticism regarding certain nominations. James Corden's nomination for Best Actor – Motion Picture Musical or Comedy (for his performance in The Prom) and the two nominations for Emily in Paris have faced controversy. The HFPA also drew criticism for the placement of Minari in the Best Foreign Language Film category, despite being an American film about a Korean-American family; it ultimately won. The determination that the film would be eligible for this category rather than Best Motion Picture – Drama, based on the Globes' rule that any film with over 50% of its dialogue not in English would be considered a Foreign Language Film, invited controversy. Lulu Wang, whose film The Farewell was subject to the same rule the previous year, wrote that "I have not seen a more American film than #Minari this year. It's a story about an immigrant family, IN America, pursuing the American dream. We really need to change these antiquated rules that characterize American as only English-speaking". Author Viet Thanh Nguyen wrote that the "decision speaks powerfully to the issue of what makes something — a language or a person or a culture — foreign". Many other filmmakers, actors, and authors, including Nia DaCosta, Daniel Dae Kim, Min Jin Lee, Franklin Leonard, Simu Liu, Phil Lord, Celeste Ng, Harry Shum Jr., and Phillipa Soo criticized the decision on similar grounds.

The nominations for the film Music'' also faced criticism for the casting of Maddie Ziegler as an autistic person, and concerns over what impact the film could have on the perception and handling of autistic people, with co-host Tina Fey joking that "Twitter is saying it's the most offensive casting since Kate Hudson was the Weightwatchers spokesperson". Hosts Fey and Amy Poehler also acknowledged the recent revelation that the HFPA has not had a single Black member for over twenty years.

Viewership
The ceremony received 6.9 million viewers in the United States, with a 1.5 Nielsen rating among adults 18 to 49, representing a 68% drop in viewership from the previous year's ceremony. It is the least viewed Golden Globe Awards telecast since the 65th Golden Globe Awards in 2008, which was solely a press conference due to the 2007–08 Writers Guild of America strike.

References

External links
 
 
 

Golden Globe
Golden Globe
Golden Globe
Golden Globe
2021 in California
2021 in New York City
February 2021 events in the United States
078
Impact of the COVID-19 pandemic on cinema
Impact of the COVID-19 pandemic on television
2021 television awards